John Gordon Waller (born December 12, 1970) is an American contemporary Christian singer/songwriter.

Life and career

Early life
John was the lead singer for the late-1990s band According to John. After the band quit in 2001, he became a worship leader at South Link CPP (Free Methodist Church) in Colorado.
John was also the praise leader at New Hope Baptist Church in Fayetteville Georgia.

Career
In 2007, John was signed to the Christian label Beach Street Records and has released his debut album The Blessing in March 2007. He toured with Casting Crowns and Leeland on the spring leg of The Altar and the Door tour, which ended on May 31, 2008.

His single "While I'm Waiting" became an American Christian radio hit after appearing in the movie Fireproof.

His third studio album, As for Me and My House, was released May 3, 2011 through City of Peace Records. It includes 11 tracks including the title track "As for Me and My House" and was produced by Jason Hoard.

His fifth studio album, Crazy Faith, was released on August 21, 2015, by City of Peace Media. The title track was featured in War Room.

Personal life
John, his wife Josee, and their ten children currently reside in California.

Three of the ten children are three siblings, Max, Anya, and Olga, adopted from Ukraine. John believes that God led him to adopt "Anna" (Anya) through signs and dreams.

"John and Josee Waller, who live in Coweta County, had two children visit in their home this past summer through the Project One Forty Three program. Max, 14, and his sister, Anya, 9, came from Ukraine to spend several weeks with the Wallers, who decided to adopt them." Concert to benefit Ukraine adoption
At the time of the host, John and Josee were not aware of the third sibling.  It was not until they decided to adopt Anya and Max that they learned of Olga, who had been separated from her brother and sister for seven years.

Waller was named one of 10 "Faces to Watch" by Billboard in 2007.

Discography

Albums

Singles

References

External links
 

Living people
1970 births
Beach Street Records artists
Reunion Records artists
Songwriters from Georgia (U.S. state)
Free Methodist Church members
21st-century American singers
21st-century American male singers